Ilijas Farah (born February 18, 1966, in Sremska Mitrovica, Serbia) is a Canadian-Serbian mathematician and a professor of mathematics at York Universityin Toronto and at the Mathematical Institute of Serbian Academy of Sciences and Arts, Belgrade, Serbia. His research focuses on applications of logic to operator algebras.

Career
He received his BSc and MSc in 1988 and 1992 respectively from the Belgrade University and his PhD in 1997 from the University of Toronto. He is now a Research Chair in Logic and Operator Algebras at York University, Toronto. Before moving to York University he was an NSERC Postdoctoral Fellow, York University (1997–99), a Hill Assistant Professor at Rutgers University (1999–2000), and a professor at CUNY–Graduate center and College of Staten Island (2000–02).

Awards, distinctions, and recognitions
 Sacks prize for the best doctorate in Mathematical Logic, 1997
 Governor General's gold medal for one of the two best doctorates at the University of Toronto, 1998
 The Canadian Association for Graduate Studies/University Microfilms International Distinguished Dissertation Award, for the best dissertation in engineering, medicine and the natural sciences in Canada, 1998.
 Dean's award for outstanding research, York University, 2006.
 Faculty Excellence in Research Award (Established Research Award), Faculty of Science, York University, 2017
Professor Farah was an invited speaker at the ICM, Seoul 2014, section on Logic and Foundations, where he presented his work on applications of logic to operator algebras.

Sources

External links
 
 
 
 Ilijas Farah: Krajnja proširenja modela, MSc thesis, Belgrade university 1992.

Living people
Canadian mathematicians
Mathematical logicians
Set theorists
1966 births